Culicoides hermani is a species of Culicoides. It is found in Central America.

References

hermani
Insects described in 2004